Balgarva is a crofting settlement on South Uist in the Outer Hebrides, Scotland. Balgarva is within the parish of South Uist.

References

External links

Canmore - South Uist, Balgarva site record
Canmore - Baile Gharbhaidh, South Uist site record

Villages on South Uist